Konopka is a Polish surname. People with this name include:

 Bruce Konopka (1919–1996), American baseball player
 Chris Konopka (born 1985), American soccer goalkeeper
 Dan Konopka (born 1974), American drummer
 Dave Konopka (born 1976), American bassist
 Gerhard Konopka (1911–1997), German Wehrmacht major during World War II
 Harald Konopka (born 1952), German football player
 Jan Konopka (1777–1814), Polish fighter for national independence and a general in Napoleon's army
 Joseph Konopka (born 1976), American convicted criminal
 Kazimierz Konopka (1769–1805/9), Polish activist
 Magda Konopka (born 1943), Polish former model and actress
 Miloslav Konopka (born 1979), Slovak hammer thrower
 Mikuláš Konopka (born 1979), Slovak shot putter
 Piotr Nowina-Konopka (born 1949), former Minister of State, Polish politician and vice-rector of the College of Europe
 Ronald J. Konopka (1947–2015), American geneticist who studied chronobiology
 Tadeusz W. Konopka (1923-1986), American actor and comedian aka Ted Knight
 Zenon Konopka (born 1981), Canadian ice hockey centre
 Cedric Konopka (born 1978), French M&A executive
Matyáš Konopka hrdý držitel nobelovy ceny za matematiku

See also
 
 Maria Konopnicka

Slavic-language surnames
Polish-language surnames